Polichno  is a village in the administrative district of Gmina Nakło nad Notecią, within Nakło County, Kuyavian-Pomeranian Voivodeship, in north-central Poland. It is located in the ethnographic region of Pałuki.

History
Polichno was a royal village, administratively located in the Kcynia County in the Kalisz Voivodeship in the Greater Poland Province of the Polish Crown.

During the German occupation (World War II), in October 1939, the German Selbstschutz carried out a massacre of Poles from Polichno and nearby Rozwarzyn in the local forest as part of the Intelligenzaktion.

References

Villages in Nakło County
Nazi war crimes in Poland